Pseudanthistiria is a genus of Asian plants in the grass family.

 Species
 Pseudanthistiria burmanica Hook.f. - Myanmar, Thailand
 Pseudanthistiria heteroclita (Roxb.) Hook.f. - India, Bangladesh
 Pseudanthistiria umbellata (Hack.) Hook.f. - India, Sri Lanka

 formerly included
see Themeda 
 Pseudanthistiria emeinica - Themeda villosa

References

Andropogoneae
Poaceae genera
Taxa named by Eduard Hackel